Charon Shemekia Copeland (born April 10, 1979) is an American electric blues vocalist. To date, she has released ten albums and been presented with seven Blues Music Awards.

Career
Copeland was born in Harlem, New York City, United States. She is the daughter of Texas blues guitarist and singer Johnny Copeland. She began singing at an early age and her first public performance was at the Cotton Club when she was about 10. She began to pursue a singing career in earnest at age 16. When her father's health began to decline, he took Shemekia on tour as his opening act, which helped establish her name on the blues circuit. Copeland graduated in 1997 from Teaneck High School in Teaneck, New Jersey.

She landed a recording contract with Alligator Records, which issued her debut album, Turn the Heat Up! in 1998, following it up with a tour of the blues festival circuit in America and Europe. Her second album, Wicked, was released in 2000 and featured a duet with one of her heroes, Ruth Brown. It earned her three Blues Music Awards.

The follow-up record, Talking to Strangers, was produced by Dr. John, and in 2005 she released The Soul Truth, produced by Steve Cropper.

In 2008, Copeland signed with Telarc International, and released her first album, Never Going Back, with that label in February 2009. She won the "Rising Star - Blues Artist" in Down Beat magazine's critics poll announced in the December 2009 issue.

Copeland participated in the Efes Pilsen Blues Festival in 2009. On June 12, 2011 at the 2011 Chicago Blues Festival, Copeland was presented Koko Taylor's crown, and officially given the honor as the new "Queen of the Blues" by Koko Taylor's daughter, Cookie Taylor.

In 2013, Copeland was nominated for a Blues Music Award in the Contemporary Blues Female Artist' category. She won the title in 2016.

In October 2015, her album Outskirts of Love peaked at number 6 in the Billboard Top Blues Albums chart. In 2017 she participated in Mahindra Blues Festival, Mumbai. In August 2018, her next album, America's Child, entered the same listing at number 3. The recording won both the 'Album of the Year' and 'Contemporary Album of the Year' titles at the 40th Blues Music Awards in 2019.

In May 2020, Copeland was presented with another Blues Music Award in the 'Contemporary Blues Female Artist of the Year' category. 

In July 2022 she won the award Blues artist of the year at the annual Downbeat Critics Poll. She released her tenth studio album, Done Come Too Far, on August 19, 2022

Discography
1998: Turn the Heat Up
2000: Wicked
2002: Talking to Strangers
2005: The Soul Truth
2009: Never Going Back
2011: Shemekia Copeland - Deluxe Edition
2012: 33 1/3
2015: Outskirts of Love
2018: America's Child
2020: Uncivil War
2022: Done Come Too Far

References

External links

 Official website
 

1979 births
Living people
20th-century African-American women singers
American blues singers
American gospel singers
People from Harlem
Soul-blues musicians
Teaneck High School alumni
21st-century American singers
21st-century American women singers
Alligator Records artists
21st-century African-American women singers